Anna ("Anni") Christine Friesinger-Postma (born 11 January 1977) is a German former speed skater. Her father Georg Friesinger, of Germany, and mother Janina ("Jana") Korowicka, of Poland, were both skaters; Jana was on the Polish team at the 1976 Winter Olympics. Her brother Jan is also a speed skater. Her sister Agnes is a former speed skater. In July 2010, Friesinger retired from her active sports career when she had to be treated for severe cartilage damage in her right knee joint.

On 11 August 2009 Friesinger married former Dutch skater Ids Postma, her long-term boyfriend, at Schloss Mirabell. The celebration took place at Schloss Aigen. As of November 2013, Friesinger lives in Salzburg, Austria, and is planning to move to the Netherlands to live with Postma on his farm in Dearsum. In August 2011 she gave birth to a daughter. In May 2014, her second daughter was born.

Sports merits

Championships 
Friesinger has won five Olympic medals; gold at the 1500 m in the 2002 Winter Olympics and the team pursuit in the 2006 and 2010 Winter Olympics as well as bronze at the 3000 m in the 1998 Winter Olympics and the 1000 m in the 2006 Winter Olympics. She managed to qualify for the German speed skating team in five events at the 2006 Winter Olympics: the team pursuit and the individual races at 1000 m, 1500 m, 3000 m, and 5000 meters. However, she failed to win gold in any individual events.  In the team pursuit semifinal against the United States at the 2010 Olympics, she fell behind her team members and ended up sliding across the finish line on her belly, but Germany still succeeded in advancing to the final.

As well as being a five-time European Allround Champion and three time, World Allround Champion, Friesinger has won numerous titles in the World Single Distance Championships. Although she originally specialized in the longer distances, she also won the World Sprint Championships in 2007. In this, Friesinger became the fifth skater in history to be a World Champion in both Allround and Sprint disciplines (along with Sylvia Burka, CAN (1976 and 1977); Eric Heiden, U.S. (1977 and 1977); Natalya Petrusyova, URS (1980 and 1982); and Karin Kania-Enke, GDR (1980 and 1982)).

Records

Personal records
Friesinger has set the world record at the 1500 m distance four times during her career, but the record has since been superseded by Canadian competitor Cindy Klassen.

Source: SpeedskatingResults.com

She is currently in 9th position in the adelskalender.

World records 

Source: SpeedSkatingStats.com

Non-sport activities 
Friesinger has done some modeling work as a sideline, and she has appeared as a swimsuit model in several publications. She is also known for her particularly powerful thighs, as befits a champion speed skater.

Autobiography 
 Mein Leben, mein Sport, meine besten Fitness-Tipps  ("My Life, My Sport, My Best Fitness Tips"). March 2004, Goldmann.  .

References

External links 
 
 Anni Friesinger at Speed Skating Stats
 Anni Friesinger Fan Site – at Skate Log, edited by Kathie Fry
 
 
 

1977 births
German female speed skaters
Speed skaters at the 1998 Winter Olympics
Speed skaters at the 2002 Winter Olympics
Speed skaters at the 2006 Winter Olympics
Speed skaters at the 2010 Winter Olympics
Olympic speed skaters of Germany
Medalists at the 1998 Winter Olympics
Medalists at the 2002 Winter Olympics
Medalists at the 2006 Winter Olympics
Medalists at the 2010 Winter Olympics
Olympic medalists in speed skating
Olympic gold medalists for Germany
Olympic bronze medalists for Germany
World record setters in speed skating
People from Bad Reichenhall
Sportspeople from Upper Bavaria
German people of Polish descent
Living people
World Allround Speed Skating Championships medalists
World Single Distances Speed Skating Championships medalists
World Sprint Speed Skating Championships medalists